Nathan Stephenson  (born July 27, 1986) is a Canadian former actor best known for his starring roles in Radio Free Roscoe as Robbie McGrath and in System Crash as James Alexander. He has also guest starred on Naturally, Sadie, Dark Oracle and in the TV film Cyber Seduction: His Secret Life. In 2007, he also played Griffin, an HIV positive engineering university student who was roommates with Paige Michalchuk, Marco Del Rossi, and Ellie Nash in Degrassi: The Next Generation.

Filmography

References

External links 

1986 births
Living people
Canadian male film actors
Canadian male television actors
Canadian male voice actors
Canadian male child actors
Male actors from Toronto
Black Canadian male actors